William Charles Frank (24 July 1923 – 18 January 2023) was a Canadian Progressive Conservative politician who was a member of the House of Commons of Canada. He was a businessman and merchant by career and was very involved in his local community.

Life and career
Frank was born in London Township, Ontario on 24 July 1923. He first attempted to seek election as a Member of Parliament at the Middlesex riding in the 1968 federal election but was defeated by Jim Lind of the Liberal party. Frank made another attempt in the 1972 general election and succeeded, however, he only served in the 29th Canadian Parliament. With changes to electoral district boundaries, he campaigned in the new Middlesex—London—Lambton riding in the following election and lost to Liberal candidate Larry Condon. Bill Frank made one more unsuccessful attempt to return to Parliament in the 1980 election at London—Middlesex, but again a Liberal candidate, Garnet Bloomfield, won.

Frank died in London Township, Ontario on 18 January 2023, at the age of 99.

References

External links
 

1923 births
2023 deaths
Members of the House of Commons of Canada from Ontario
People from Middlesex County, Ontario
Progressive Conservative Party of Canada MPs